Nam Ji-sung and Song Min-kyu were the defending champions but chose not to defend their title.

Hsu Yu-hsiou and Yuta Shimizu won the title after defeating Masamichi Imamura and Rio Noguchi 7–6(7–2), 6–4 in the final.

Seeds

Draw

References

External links
 Main draw

Yokkaichi Challenger - Doubles